Life Space Death is a collaborative album by Toshinori Kondo and Bill Laswell, released on April 22, 2001 by Meta Records.

Track listing

Personnel 
Adapted from the Life Space Death liner notes.
Musicians
The Dalai Lama – voice
Toshinori Kondo – trumpet, electronics
Kalimpong Monastery monks – vocals, bells, horns and drums (4)
Bill Laswell – bass guitar, guitar, keyboards, producer
Technical personnel
Michael Fossenkemper – mastering
Robert Musso – engineering
Ellen Roebuck – design
Dalai Roebuck – design

Release history

References

External links 
 Life Space Death at Bandcamp
 

2001 albums
Collaborative albums
Toshinori Kondo albums
Bill Laswell albums
Albums produced by Bill Laswell